Cyperus marquisensis is a species of sedge that is native to the Cook Islands and the Marquesas Islands in the Pacific Ocean.

See also 
 List of Cyperus species

References 

marquisensis
Plants described in 1931
Flora of the Cook Islands
Flora of the Marquesas Islands
Taxa named by Forest B.H. Brown